Movie Stars is an American sitcom television series that aired on The WB from July 11, 1999 to June 18, 2000. It stars Harry Hamlin and Jennifer Grant as famous Hollywood actors trying to raise their children.

Synopsis
Reese Hardin (Hamlin) was the star of over-the-top but high-grossing action films while Jacey Watts (Grant), his second wife, was an often-nominated dramatic actress. They lived in a fancy house in Malibu, California, (next door to Tom Hanks, who was never seen) and raising their children, Apache and Moonglow.  Also living with them were Reese's less successful brother Todd and Lori, Reese's daughter from his first marriage. Apache always tried to come up with marketing ideas for his parents; in the second season he worked to try to get Jacey the Oscar he felt she deserved. A running gag was that Todd's poker buddies were the real-life less-successful brothers of John Travolta, Patrick Swayze, and Sylvester Stallone, playing fictionalized versions of themselves.

Cast

Main
 Harry Hamlin as Reese Hardin, action star. Reese is revered for his heroic adventure performances, including the role of Persius in Clash of the Titans (a running inside-joke), but his sensitive portrayals and frequent lack of clothing have made him a reluctant gay icon and favorite among female viewers.
 Jennifer Grant as Jacey Wyatt, award-winning actress. Although she's 15 years Reese's junior, Jacey is generally mature and an anchor for her family. In her professional life, however, she has a propensity for being petty and jealous.
 Marnette Patterson as Lori Lansford, Reese's surly teenage daughter from his first marriage. New to the Hollywood scene and naive to its ways, Lori frequently finds herself at odds with her family, who have her best interests at heart. Shiri Appleby played the role in the original version of the pilot, but Patterson reshot her scenes prior to the show's debut.
 Zack Hopkins as Apache Hardin, Reese and Jacy's teenage son. Apache is an Alex P. Keaton type, a smart alec teenager who tries to weasel his way into the elite Hollywood social circles.
 Rachel David as Moonglow Hardin, Reese and Jacey's precocious but potentially unhinged young daughter.
 Mark Benninghoffen as Todd Hardin, Reese's younger brother. Todd graduated from Juilliard and set off to Hollywood with his brother in tow, not realizing Reese would waltz onto the scene and become a superstar. Todd has largely been relegated to commercials and extra work, with significant appearances in Mentos and Japanese underwear commercials, as well as appearing as an extra in Titanic. Todd's only friends are other siblings of famous persons, including Stallone, Swayze, and Travolta.
 Anne Haney as Francine Hardin, Reese and Todd's mother. Following the death of her husband, Francine moved into Reese's Malibu beach house, where she spent her days acting as a housekeeper, making snarky remarks, and occasionally revealing family secrets. Francine vanished without explanation in season two.

Recurring
 Joey Travolta as himself. Joey is level-headed and nurturing, the mother hen of Todd's poker group—although he has no problems razzing his buddies if he feels that they deserve it.
 Don Swayze as himself. Don is the oddball of the group, overly sensitive and sometimes outright weird.
 Frank Stallone as himself. Although Frank loves his brother, he's deeply jealous of Sly's fame. He's also prone to breaking into song.

Episodes

Season 1 (1999)

Season 2 (2000)

References

External links
 
 

1990s American sitcoms
1999 American television series debuts
2000s American sitcoms
2000 American television series endings
English-language television shows
Television shows set in Malibu, California
The WB original programming
Television series by Castle Rock Entertainment